Hajjiabad-e Aqa (also Romanized as Ḩājjīābād-e Āqā and Ḩajīābād-e Āqā) is a village in Qanavat Rural District, in the Central District of Qom County, Qom Province, Iran. At the 2006 census, its population was 291, in 63 families.

References 

Populated places in Qom Province